László Jávor (May 4, 1903 – December 2, 1992) was a Hungarian poet and painter who wrote the poem that was the basis for the song "Gloomy Sunday", composed by Rezső Seress, later also notably recorded by Billie Holiday. He was born in Budapest and died in Cannes.

References

Javor, Laszlo
1903 births
1992 deaths
20th-century Hungarian poets
20th-century Hungarian male writers